Moore Township may refer to:

Kansas
 Moore Township, Barber County, Kansas
 Moore Township, Marion County, Kansas

Michigan
 Moore Township, Michigan

Minnesota
 Moore Township, Stevens County, Minnesota

Missouri
 Moore Township, Shannon County, Missouri
 Moore Township, Oregon County, Missouri

North Dakota
 Moore Township, Ransom County, North Dakota, in Ransom County, North Dakota

Pennsylvania
 Moore Township, Northampton County, Pennsylvania

South Dakota
 Moore Township, Charles Mix County, South Dakota, in Charles Mix County, South Dakota

Township name disambiguation pages